A Stolen Life may refer to:

Film and television
Stolen Life (1939 film), a British film
A Stolen Life (film), a 1946 American drama film
Stolen Life (1998 film), a French film
Stolen Life (2005 film), a Chinese film
Stolen (2009 American film) (prerelease title Stolen Lives), an American mystery film
Stolen Life (TV series), a Bulgarian TV series

Other uses
A Stolen Life (book), a 2011 memoir by Jaycee Dugard
Stolen Lives: Twenty Years in a Desert Jail, a 1999 autobiography by Malika Oufkir
"Stolen Life", a 2014 song by Arch Enemy from War Eternal